The 2011 ICF Canoe Slalom World Championships took place from September 7–11, 2011 in Bratislava, Slovakia under the auspices of International Canoe Federation. It was the 34th edition. Bad weather conditions on September 7 and 8 forced the organizers to make changes to the schedule. The events were all held over the remaining three days of the Championships. The women's C1 team event debuted at these championships, but did not count as an official medal event due to insufficient number of participating federations.

The event was also the only global qualification for the 2012 Summer Olympics in London.

It was the first time Slovakia hosted the ICF Canoe Slalom World Championships. The races were held in the Čunovo Water Sports Centre on an offshoot of the river Danube near the borders with Austria and Hungary. Slovakia won the medal table with 3 golds, 2 silvers and 3 bronzes.

Medal summary

Men's results

Canoe

Kayak

Women's results

Canoe

Kayak

Medal table

This does not count the C1 women's team event.

References

External links
 Official website

Canoe Slalom World Championships
World Canoe Slalom Championships
2011
International sports competitions hosted by Slovakia
2011,ICF Canoe Slalom World Championships
Sports competitions in Bratislava
Canoeing and kayaking competitions in Slovakia
September 2011 sports events in Europe